Liverpool is a suburb of Greater Western Sydney, in the state of New South Wales, Australia. Liverpool is the administrative seat of the local government area of the City of Liverpool and is situated in the Cumberland Plain.

History
Liverpool is one of the oldest urban settlements in Australia, founded on 7 November 1810 as an agricultural centre by Governor Lachlan Macquarie. He named it after Robert Banks Jenkinson, Earl of Liverpool, who was then the Secretary of State for the Colonies and the English city of Liverpool, upon which some of the area's architecture is based.

Liverpool is at the head of navigation of the Georges River and combined with the Great Southern Railway from Sydney to Melbourne reaching Liverpool in the late 1850s, Liverpool became a major agricultural and transportation centre as the land in the district was very productive.

Until the 1950s, Liverpool was still a satellite town with an agricultural economy based on poultry farming and market gardening. However the urban sprawl of Sydney across the Cumberland Plain soon reached Liverpool, and it became an outer suburb of metropolitan Sydney with a strong working-class presence and manufacturing facilities. The Liverpool area also became renowned for its vast Housing Commission estates housing thousands of low-income families after the slum clearance and urban renewal programs in inner-city Sydney in the 1960s.

Heritage listings 
Liverpool has a number of heritage-listed sites, including:
 251 Bigge Street: Liverpool Courthouse
 Birkdale Crescent: Collingwood
 College Street: Old Liverpool Hospital
 Elizabeth Drive: St Luke's Anglican Church
 Georges River, Heathcote Road near Newbridge Road: Liverpool Weir
 Great Southern railway: Liverpool railway station
 17 Speed Street: Rosebank

Commercial area

Liverpool is currently the major city centre in Greater South Western Sydney. The city centre has a Hoddle Grid layout with many little laneways and arcades, similar to that of Melbourne. The central retail strip is Macquarie Street which contains numerous small cafes. In recent times the extension of the Westfield shopping centre has seen many new fashion stores come in. The Central Business District is being touted as the third commercial centre in the Greater Sydney Metropolitan area (after Central Sydney and Parramatta), centred around the Western Sydney Airport and aerotropolis. The CBD was rezoned for mixed use in 2018 to allow for more homes, offices and shops.

The main shopping area is centred on Macquarie Street, with Westfield Liverpool, a major shopping centre at the northern end. Liverpool Plaza is a shopping mall located between Macquarie Mall & Northumberland Street. The northern end of the city has been zoned for high density residential apartments. The southern end of the city is zoned for high density commercial developments. Liverpool has a large teaching hospital, two technical colleges and many shopping centres and office buildings. The private hospital operator Healthscope owns the Sydney Southwest Private Hospital in Liverpool.

Transport

Liverpool is well served by roads such as the Hume Highway (also known as Liverpool Road), the M5 Motorway, the Westlink M7 Motorway.

Liverpool railway station has services to the Sydney CBD, Leppington, Parramatta and Schofields. The Liverpool to Parramatta transitway provides a bus-only route for buses.

For details of long distance and local bus services see Liverpool station.

Schools and places of worship

There are three public primary schools within the suburb of Liverpool: Liverpool Public School, Liverpool West and Marsden Road. Liverpool Boys and Liverpool Girls are the two public secondary schools. The Mainsbridge School caters to children with intellectual disabilities and Liverpool Hospital School for children hospitalized for lengthy periods.

Private schools include All Saints Primary School, All Saints Catholic College and Al Amanah College.

Post secondary education is catered to with the South Western College of TAFE, Macarthur Community College, Liverpool U3A: School for Seniors, University of Western Sydney English Language Centre, School of Arts in Macquarie Street, and The University Of Wollongong.

St Lukes Anglican Church, located in the city centre across the road from Westfield Liverpool, is the oldest Anglican church in Australia. All Saints Catholic Church in George St is located with the All Saints schools. St Raphael, Nickolas and Irene Greek Orthodox Church is in Forbes Street and the Serbian Orthodox Church of the Apostle Luke is on Flowerdale Rd.

Sport and recreation

Parks

There are many open spaces within the city centre, including botanical parks and sporting facilities. Bigge Park on the east side of the city features a War Memorial while Pioneer Memorial Park to the north has a historical cemetery. Woodward Park to the west is the main sporting precinct containing a number of outdoor playing fields and the Whitlam Leisure Centre, hosting a swimming pool and a 3000-seat indoor sports stadium. Other notable sports facilities within the suburb of Liverpool include Collimore Park (netball) and Paciullo Park (soccer and touch football).

Sporting teams
Prominent local teams include Fairfield-Liverpool Cricket Club which plays in the Sydney Grade Cricket competition, Liverpool City Netball, which has participated successfully in many State and representative competitions, Hinchinbrook Hornets Junior Rugby League and FC Bossy Liverpool which plays in the New South Wales Super League and Liverpool Rangers FC which is located at Ireland Park, Memorial Avenue. The West Sydney Razorbacks basketball team used to play out of the Gough Whitlam Centre while they were in the NBL. Liverpool is also home to Australian Ice Hockey League team the Sydney Ice Dogs who play out of the Liverpool Catholic Club Ice Rink and Liverpool little athletics.

Media
Liverpool has an arts and creation centre which provides music lessons with instruments such as:guitar, drums and banjo etc.

Liverpool is currently served by a full-time radio station 89.3FM 2GLF which broadcasts local information, music and ethnic programming. It is one of the first FM radio stations setup in the early '80s.

Liverpool has had several newspapers since the late 1800s. The first newspaper appeared in Liverpool in 1886 was The Liverpool Times which was soon superseded by The Liverpool Mercury. Both of these newspapers were then incorporated with The Liverpool Herald. There was also the free newspaper The Liverpool News that ran from 1904 to about 1973.
Liverpool now has two newspapers, The Liverpool Leader and The Liverpool Champion published every Wednesday.

Population

Demographics

According to the 2016 census conducted by the Australian Bureau of Statistics, Liverpool had a population of 27,084. These came from a wide variety of ethnic backgrounds; less than one-third (31.1%) of residents were born in Australia. The next most common countries of birth were Lebanon (10.9%), India (6.4%), Fiji (2.9%), Vietnam (2.5%) and Croatia (2.4%). The most popular ethnic responses were Indian (8.4%), Australian (7.9%), English (7.0%), Iraqi (6.5%) and Serbian (6.3%).

22.2% of people only spoke English at home. Other languages spoken at home included Arabic 18.1%, Serbian 7.4%, Hindi 3.9%, Vietnamese 3.5% and Spanish 2.2%.

Liverpool is remarkable for the high proportion of people who reported following some religion in the Census; only 8.8% stated that they had no religion, much lower than the national average of 22.3%. This Census question is optional and 14.9% of residents did not respond to it, which introduces some uncertainty into all the religious figures. The most common responses for religion were Catholic 17.3, Islam 14.8% and "Miscellaneous Religions" 8.9%.

The age distribution is just a little younger than the rest of the country: the median age of Liverpool residents was 34 years (national median is 37). Children aged 0–14 years made up 21.0% of the population (19.3% nationally) and people aged 65 years and over made up 11.9%% of the population (14.0% nationally).

Over half (57.8%) the dwellings in Liverpool were apartments and 55.9% were being rented, which is significantly higher than the national average of 29.6%.

Notable people from Liverpool

 Mark Bosnich, former footballer
 Leslie Camilleri, convicted criminal with 3x life imprisonment charges
 Michael Clarke, cricketer
 Sir Jenkin Coles, auctioneer and politician
 Walter Hampson Cooper, journalist, playwright, politician and barrister
 Isaac De Gois, rugby league player 
 Mitchell Duke, soccer player 
 Michael Dwyer, Irish Rebellion Leader (1798–1803) and Chief of Police Liverpool (1813–1820)
 Nathan Foley, a former member of Hi-5, entertainer
 Frederick Augustus Forbes, store-keeper, grazier and politician
 Scott Gardiner, first golfer of Aboriginal descent to play on the PGA Tour
 Jennifer Harrison, poet
 Liam Hatcher, cricketer 
 Vic Hey, rugby league player
 Brett Hodgson, rugby league player
 Harry Kewell, soccer player 
 Craig Knowles, politician
 Terry Lamb, rugby league player 
 Anthony Minichiello, rugby league player
 Mark Minichiello, rugby league player
 Brad Morrin, rugby league player
 Pat Richards, rugby league player
 Richard Sadleir (1794–1889), first mayor of Liverpool (in 1872)
 Lenny Zappavigna, boxer

Politics

The suburb of Liverpool is split in its representation at all three levels of government with Hoxton Park Road the divider in each case. At the local level, Liverpool is part of the City of Liverpool, which is divided into two wards, the North Ward on the north side of Hoxton Park Road and the South Ward on the other side. Each ward elects five councillors and the council currently consists of four Labor councillors, five Liberals, one member of the Liverpool Community Independents Team (LCIT). There is also a directly elected mayor, Ned Mannoun.

For New South Wales state elections, the north side of Liverpool is located in the Electoral district of Liverpool, held by Paul Lynch, while the south side is in the Electoral district of Macquarie Fields, held by Anoulack Chanthivong. Both men are members of the Australian Labor Party. Federally, the north side of Liverpool is located in the Division of Hughes held by Craig Kelly of the United Australia Party. The south side is part of the Division of Werriwa, held by Labor's Anne Stanley.

The table at right illustrates recent election results in the Liverpool area by combining results from each of the five booths located in the suburb of Liverpool. The results indicate the suburb is a safe Labor area with the Labor primary vote well above 50% at both the last state and federal elections.

Geography 
The Cooks River/Castlereagh Ironbark ecological community and Cumberland Plain Woodland are the indigenous flora community of the area, which are found in remnants within the suburb.

Climate 

Liverpool has a humid subtropical climate (Köppen climate classification: Cfa) and is a few degrees warmer than the Sydney CBD at daytime, although nights are slightly cooler than Sydney's. If the maximum temperature is 27 °C in the city, in Liverpool it could typically reach as high as 33 °C, while in winter the temperature can be close to 0 °C while it is above 7 °C in central Sydney. Rainfall is somewhat spread throughout the months, although the first half tends to be wetter. July to September tend to be drier, namely due to foehn winds originating from the Great Dividing Range.

References

External links
 Liverpool City Council website

 Spokey Blokeys - Liverpool - Episode 25

 
Suburbs of Sydney
1810 establishments in Australia
Cities in New South Wales
Hume Highway